The 2022 Tour de Wallonie (known as the Ethias–Tour de Wallonie for sponsorship reasons) was a five-stage men's professional road cycling race mainly held in the Belgian region of Wallonia. It was a 2.Pro race as part of the 2022 UCI ProSeries calendar. It was the 49th edition of the Tour de Wallonie, which started on 23 July and finished on 27 July.

Teams 
Fourteen of the eighteen UCI WorldTeams, six UCI ProTeams, and two UCI Continental teams made up the twenty-two teams that participated in the race.

UCI WorldTeams

 
 
 
 
 
 
 
 
 
 
 
 
 
 

UCI ProTeams

 
 
 
 
 
 

UCI Continental Teams

Route

Stages

Stage 1 
23 July 2022 — Temploux to Huy,

Stage 2 
24 July 2022 — Verviers to Herve,

Stage 3 
25 July 2022 — Visé to Rochefort,

Stage 4 
26 July 2022 — Durbuy to Couvin,

Stage 5 
27 July 2022 — Le Roeulx to Chapelle-lez-Herlaimont,

Classification leadership table

Classification standings

General classification

Points classification

Mountains classification

Sprints classification

Young rider classification

Team classification

References

External links 
  

2022
2022 UCI Europe Tour
2022 UCI ProSeries
2022 in Belgian sport
July 2022 sports events in Belgium